The Contract (previously known as Squat) is a 2016 British crime thriller feature film directed by Nic Auerbach. The Contract is a nascent love story of two people from polar opposite worlds, thrown together by circumstance. The film stars Robert Fucilla, Sarah Armstrong, Danny Webb, Patrick Ryecart, Antonio Aakeel, and Jack Brady. The film was released on DVD and online 18 January 2016.

Plot
The Contract follows Nick Dayton (Robert Fucilla) a self-centered, narcissistic, Hedge Fund Trader, who prefers the extremely lavish life-style his job affords. Returning from a business trip, Nick arrives home to his multimillion-dollar mansion, to find it has peculiarly been taken over by squatters. It is here, Nick finds himself fortuitously linked with Erika (Sarah Armstrong). A damaged young woman. and seemingly the polar opposite of Nick, Erika is a woman suffering from amnesia and mysteriously has Nick's address tattooed on her arm. Attempting to unravel the mystery, both Nick and Erika find themselves enmeshed in the violent underworld of organised crime, led by the unhinged and barbarous Roy (Danny Webb). Now acutely aware the seriousness of the situation, Nick soon comes to the rare realisation that not all of his problems can be disentangled with money. If Nick has any chance of solving this bewildering mystery, and save both his and Erika's lives, he is going to have to use his ingenuity and smarts to outwit both the syndicate and the violent and sadistic Roy.

Cast

 Robert Fucilla as Nick Dayton
 Sarah Armstrong as Erika
 Danny Webb as Roy
 Patrick Ryecart as Gregg
 Antonio Aakeel as Raza
 Isabelle Allen as Casey
 Dean Bardini as Joey
 Jack Brady as Falco
 Nicky Evans as Dragon
 Jody Halse as Hughie
 John Davis as The Marvel
 Jonathan Rhodes as Chris
 Surinder Duhra as Fahad
 Loren O'Dair as Melanie
 Izabella Fucilla as Amy 
 Holly Rose Hoyland as Audrey
 Alexandra Agass as Squatter
 Leon Annor as Pork Belly

Production
The Contract was developed by Scanner Rhodes Productions and Robert Fucilla Company initially under the working title Squat. In post production, the film's title changed to The Contract. The entire film was shot in London, England late 2014 - early 2015.

Release
Rialto distribution secured the Australian distribution rights and the film was released globally on DVD and online / Via VOD services 18 January 2016.

References

External links
 

2016 films
British action films
British crime thriller films
2016 crime thriller films
Films set in London
Films shot in London
Squatting in film
Films scored by Erran Baron Cohen
2010s English-language films
2010s British films